South West Yorkshire Partnership NHS Foundation Trust is a NHS trust which provides mental health, learning disability and community health care services in Calderdale, Kirklees, Wakefield and Barnsley. The trust also provides some of the medium secure forensic services for the Yorkshire and the Humber region. The trust's headquarters is located at Fieldhead Hospital in Wakefield which is a psychiatric and learning disabilities hospital.

History

The trust was formed in 2002 when mental health services in the southern half of West Yorkshire were re-organised and brought together the service provisions from the districts of Calderdale, Kirklees and Wakefield. The Trust was originally called South West Yorkshire Mental Health NHS Trust (SWYMHT) with the headquarters based at Fieldhead Hospital in Wakefield. The new trust inherited a large estate from the previous three predecessor Trusts such as the Sycamores Community Unit for the Elderly in Ossett; Poplars Community Unit for the Elderly in Hemsworth; Enfield Down in Honley; The Dales Unit and Lyndhurst in Halifax; the Priestley Unit and 8 Fox View in Dewsbury; Wells House in Sowerby Bridge and Castleford, Normanton and District Hospital.

On 31 March 2009, the trust became a NHS foundation trust and was renamed South West Yorkshire Partnership NHS Foundation Trust.

In 2013 when the primary care trusts were abolished as part of the Health and Social Care Act 2012 the trust took over the mental health services and community health care provisions from Barnsley PCT and as such the trust's footprint expanded to cover two counties. The trust's estate expanded once again to include Kendray Hospital and Mount Vernon Hospital with a number of health centres and offices within the Barnsley district.

Rob Webster, Former Chief Executive, was top of the poll in the  Health Service Journal’s Top 50 chief executives in 2021, the first from a mental health trust.

Services

The trust's structure is based upon six business delivery units (BDUs):

Calderdale
Kirklees
Barnsley
Wakefield
Forensic
Specialist Services

Like most mental health trusts, the trust has reduced the number of beds in order to release resources for care at home.

Child and adolescent mental health services in Calderdale and Kirklees, previously delivered by Calderdale and Huddersfield NHS Foundation Trust were transferred to South West Yorkshire Partnership Foundation Trust in 2013.

Locala won a tender for the Care Closer to Home contract worth £284.9m over seven years from Greater Huddersfield and North Kirklees Clinical Commissioning Groups in June 2015 which is delivered in a partnership with the Trust, a local hospice and other third sector organisations.

On 1 September 2017 the trust launched a new perinatal mental health service which is based in Dewsbury and operates across the trust.

The trust was required to give undertakings in consideration of the Information Commissioner's Office not exercising its powers to serve an enforcement notice after it had sent patient data to the wrong address on a number of occasions.

The Trust was named by the Health Service Journal as one of the top hundred NHS trusts to work for in 2015.  At that time it had 4,235 full-time equivalent staff and a sickness absence rate of 4.81%. 63% of staff recommend it as a place for treatment and 56% recommended it as a place to work.

See also

 List of NHS trusts

References

NHS foundation trusts
NHS mental health trusts
Health in Yorkshire